Tiberius Nyachwaya (born 8 February 1955) is a Kenyan judoka. He competed in the men's middleweight event at the 1988 Summer Olympics.

References

1955 births
Living people
Kenyan male judoka
Olympic judoka of Kenya
Judoka at the 1988 Summer Olympics
Place of birth missing (living people)